SHD may refer to:
 Shenandoah Valley Regional Airport, the IATA code SHD
 Sahara Airlines (Algeria), the ICAO code SHD
 ISO 639:shd, the ISO 639 code for the Kundal Shahi language 
 Defence Historical Service (French: Service historique de la défense), the archives centre of Ministry of Defence and its armed forces
 Sandhoff disease, a lysosomal genetic, lipid storage disorder